The Corruptor (real name Jackson Day) is a fictional character, a supervillain appearing in American comic books published by Marvel Comics. He has fought Thor and Nova (Richard Rider). His sweat glands release a chemical that overrides the social inhibition center of the brain. He first appeared in Nova #4 in Dec. 1976 and was created by Marv Wolfman and Sal Buscema.

Publication history
The Corruptor first appeared in Nova #4 (Dec. 1976), and was created by Marv Wolfman and Sal Buscema.

The character subsequently appears in Nova #21 (Sept. 1978), The Incredible Hulk vol. 2 #264-265 (Oct.–Nov. 1981), Marvel Comics Presents #32 (Nov. 1989), Nova #10 (Oct. 1994), The Avengers #6 (July 1998), The New Avengers #6 (April 2005), Spider-Man: Breakout #1-5 (June–Oct. 2005), New Warriors #6 (Feb. 2006), Union Jack #1-3 (Nov. 2006-Jan. 2007), The Astonishing Spider-Man #1 (May 2007), The New Avengers Annual #2 (Feb. 2008), and Secret Invasion #6 (Nov. 2008) and Wolverine, the Best There Is #1 (Feb. 2011).

The Corruptor received an entry in the original Official Handbook of the Marvel Universe #3, The Official Handbook of the Marvel Universe Deluxe Edition #3, and The All-New Official Handbook to The Marvel Universe A-Z Volume 2.

Fictional character biography 
Jackson Day was born in Smyrna, Delaware. An ordinary pharmaceutical factory worker, he was exposed to psychoactive chemicals from a fire. Thor rescued him from the fire, but he had already begun to mutate, causing Thor to go on a rampage just by his touch. Day was soon transferred to the Avengers' mansion for treatment. He escaped, abandoning his wife, and became the head of the criminal Inner Circle. With the Inner Circle, he recruited people in financial straits, supplying financial assistance requiring the victims to commit crimes on his behalf. Corruptor later abandoned the Circle.

He formed a new plan that started out by corrupting the Hulk, forcing the Hulk's best friend Rick Jones to summon the Avengers so that the Corruptor could corrupt them as well. Rick's SOS instead was intercepted by several superheroes based in the Southwest, including Firebird, Phantom Rider (Hamilton Slade), Red Wolf, Texas Twister, and Shooting Star. The plan was foiled, as the Corruptor lost control of the Hulk who managed to capture the Corruptor. The western heroes decided to stay together and become the group, the Rangers.

Some time later he became a pawn of Imus Champion and somehow acquired mind control powers which he used to turn the Squadron Supreme against the Avengers shortly after they returned from the Franklin Richards version of Counter-Earth.

The Corruptor managed to escape to Japan where he was soon confronted by Sunfire who detained him in The Vault and eventually the Raft. He was one of the 46 villains to escape the Raft when Electro broke out Sauron. He was becoming a thrall of the villain Crossfire. During his efforts in service to Crossfire, Corruptor was again defeated by Spider-Man.

He found his way back to his home town, Smyrna, Delaware, and began an elaborate plan to take over the city. Using flowers grown from water distilled with his own sweat, he managed to release his chemical influence over the entire town, quickly setting himself up as its mayor. His scheme was uncovered by the New Warriors, who were roaming the country helping small towns fight big villains, and the Corruptor was defeated once more. He was later involved in a R.A.I.D terror plot in London, only to be foiled by Union Jack.

Jackson has been hired by the Hood to take advantage of the split in the superhero community caused by the Superhuman Registration Act. He helped them fight the New Avengers but was taken down by Dr. Strange. In Secret Invasion, he is one among many of supervillains who rejoined of The Hood's crime syndicate and attacked a Skrull force. He joins with the Hood's gang in an attack on the New Avengers, who were expecting the Dark Avengers instead.

Living Laser and the Corruptor attack Bucky Barnes and Steve Rogers as they spy on some H.A.M.M.E.R. agents from a rooftop in Brooklyn. He was later seen during the Siege of Asgard as part of the Hood crime syndicate.

During the "Search for Tony Stark" arc, Corruptor rejoined Hood's gang and assisted in the attack on Castle Doom.

Powers and abilities 
The Corruptor's sweat glands exude psychoactive drugs which enable him to, by touch, subvert the will of any individual. His touch releases his victim's inhibitions, so that, if not given specific instructions, the victim will revert to uncontrollable behavior. Early in his career, he demonstrated such powers as super-strength, eye-beams, and teleportation, none of which he possesses today.

References

External links 
 Corruptor at MarvelDirectory.com

Comics characters introduced in 1976
Characters created by Marv Wolfman
Characters created by Sal Buscema
Fictional characters from Delaware
Marvel Comics characters with superhuman strength
Marvel Comics male supervillains
Marvel Comics mutates